Woerdense Verlaat is a village in the Dutch province of South Holland. It is a part of the municipality of Nieuwkoop, and lies about 8 km north of Woerden.

In 2001, the village of Woerdense Verlaat had 303 inhabitants. Its built-up area was 0.067 km², and contained 113 residences.
The statistical area "Woerdense Verlaat", which also can include the peripheral parts of the village, as well as the surrounding countryside, has a population of around 690.

References

Populated places in South Holland
Geography of Nieuwkoop